Sławomir Nawrocki (born 16 September 1969) is a Polish fencer. He competed in the individual and team épée events at the 1992 Summer Olympics.

References

1969 births
Living people
Polish male fencers
Olympic fencers of Poland
Fencers at the 1992 Summer Olympics
People from Zielona Góra
Sportspeople from Lubusz Voivodeship